Orient Express is a 1953 anthology drama television series filmed in Europe and syndicated in the United States. Each episode ties-in with a story connected to the famed railroad from which the series takes its name.

Episodes 
There were 26 half hour episodes produced, among them:

A Master of Calculation (aka Matter of Calculations), featuring Geraldine Brooks
European Edition, featuring Jean Pierre Aumont
The Man of Many Skins, featuring Erich von Stroheim
His Son (aka His Boy), featuring Alan Furlan
The Red Sash, featuring Tala Birell
The Curse of Agostino, featuring David Hurst

References

External links
Orient Express at CVTA with episode list

1950s American anthology television series
1953 American television series debuts
1953 American television series endings
Black-and-white American television shows
First-run syndicated television programs in the United States